Cañete may refer to:

Cañete, Chile city in Chile
San Vicente de Cañete a town in Peru
San Vicente de Cañete District in Peru
Cañete Province in Peru
 in Peru
Cañete (Cuenca) municipality in Cuenca, Spain
The medieval Castle of Cañete, Cuenca
Cañete de las Torres, municipality in Cordoba, Spain
Cañete la Real, municipality in Málaga, Spain

People with the surname
Manuel Cañete (1822–1891), Spanish writer
Miguel Arias Cañete (1950-), Spanish politician
Marcelo Cañete (1990-), Argentinian footballer
Chacha Cañete (2004-), Filipino actress